Philbrook Museum of Art is an art museum with expansive formal gardens located in Tulsa, Oklahoma. The museum, which opened in 1939, is located in a former 1920s villa, "Villa Philbrook", the home of Oklahoma oil pioneer Waite Phillips and his wife Genevieve. Showcasing nine collections of art from all over the world, and spanning various artistic media and styles, the cornerstone collection focuses on Native American art featuring basketry, pottery, paintings and jewelry.

History

The Philbrook Art Museum, under the guidance of its first director, Eugene Kingman, opened its doors to the public on October 25, 1939 with a permanent art collection made up of works from the Tulsa Art Association and Villa Philbrook. In 1940, studio art classes were initiated and a touring program for school children the following year that resulted in the addition of a Children's Museum in 1949. A new museum wing was built in 1969 in response to an increased demand for studio art classes, but the use of this space has since changed. The art museum underwent difficult financial times in the 1980s and a renaissance in the 1990s. The name changed from the Philbrook Art Center to The Philbrook Museum of Art in 1987 when it was first accredited. In 2009, after a two-year process, Philbrook was reaccredited by the American Alliance of Museums (AAM), one of 286 art museums and 775 museums overall out of the estimated 17,500 museums in the United States.

In 1990, the museum was expanded by the addition of the  Kravis Wing that included space for a special exhibition gallery, public entry rotunda, museum school, library, a restaurant area that seats up to 100 people, an expanded museum shop and event space. The Williams Conference Center seats 75 to 80 people and the Patti Johnson Wilson Hall, an auditorium performance hall, seats up to 236 people. On June 14, 2013, Philbrook opened Philbrook Downtown, a satellite facility in Tulsa's Brady Arts District. With  dedicated to modern, contemporary, and Native American art, works on view included pieces by notable 20th-century artists, including Willem de Kooning, Robert Rauschenberg, Clyfford Still, and Georgia O'Keeffe. The upper level of the facility featured the Eugene B. Adkins Collection and the Adkins Study Center. In 2020, the satellite location closed to make way for the Bob Dylan Center.

The museum's permanent collection encompasses European, American, Native American, Modern and Contemporary Art and Design, African, Asian and Antiquities. The collection has grown steadily with gifts of American Indian pottery and basketry from Clark Field beginning in 1942 and the Roberta Campbell Lawson collection in 1947. While the American and European collection received a boost from Laura Rutherford Clubb who donated paintings in 1947, and further donations from the Samuel H. Kress Foundation in 1961 of Italian Renaissance paintings and sculptures. The Asian, African, and antiquities collections were enhanced by generous gifts from George H. Taber, Pete and Velma Gillert and Lawrence and Herbert Gussman in the succeeding three decades. Today the collection includes works from Giovanni Bellini, William-Adolphe Bouguereau, William Merritt Chase, Leonardo Drew, Arturo Herrera, Charles Loloma, Maria Martinez, Thomas Moran, Pablo Picasso, Fritz Scholder, Tanzio da Varallo, Rachel Whiteread, Kehinde Wiley, and Andrew Wyeth. The Eugene B. Adkins Collection of Native American painting, pottery and jewelry is shared with the Fred Jones Jr. Museum of Art.

Building

Villa Philbrook

The original structure of the museum is an Italian Renaissance villa that was the former home of Oklahoma oil pioneer Waite Phillips and his wife Genevieve. Phillips commissioned prominent Kansas City architect Edward Buehler Delk to design the mansion in 1926; construction began the same year by the John Long Company of Kansas City and was completed the following year. Named "Villa Philbrook," the three-story mansion was constructed of steel and a reinforced concrete framework that resulted in minimal remodeling being required to transform the villa into an art museum. The exterior of the house is stucco that includes ground white marble in the mixture causing it to glitter. The corners are quoined with Kasota limestone, quarried in Minnesota, that resemble Italian travertine. This stonework also decorates the doors and windows. In the rear of the house, a loggia showcasing five arches with Corinthian columns, highlights a terrace overlooking the formal gardens. The roof features wide eaves and is covered with oversized Italianate tiles.

The interior of the mansion featured 72 rooms decorated with travertine and marble fireplaces and fountains, floors of teak, walnut and oak and ornate ceilings reminiscent of Italian villas. The main rooms of the house were found on the ground floor. The mansion is centered by the entrance hall, framed by a double staircase, that flows directly into the receiving hall. The hall is separated by a slightly raised cross-corridor with a groin vaulted ceiling painted with Italian Renaissance designs, further defined by twisted Corinthian columns and ironwork. The main features of the receiving hall are the beams and pierced screenwork that appear to be wood, but are actually painted plaster. Also, a two-manual Aeolian pipe organ can be found behind a large tapestry. Flanking the entrance and receiving halls and accessed by the cross-corridor are the dining room and library to the left and the living and music rooms to the right. The dining and living rooms feature heavily carved coffered ceilings, and the wood paneled library is centered by a globe light fixture that reproduces a map from the time of Leonardo da Vinci. The airy music room is highlighted by a wall mural with bobbed-hair flappers in Grecian garb that illustrates four musical tempos: scherzo, andante, rondo and allegro. 

In the wing to the right of the main block of the house was a sunroom and to the left was the service wing that included the kitchen and servants quarters. On the second floor was the Phillip's private quarters containing four family bedrooms, each with a bathroom, dressing room and sleeping porch, and two guest rooms. A staircase located between the receiving hall and dining room accessed the lower floor leading to the Southwestern rooms and to the porte-cochère. In 1938, the Phillips donated Villa Philbrook and its surrounding gardens to the city of Tulsa, in hopes that the estate would be used for art and cultural purposes. While the principal rooms on the first floor were left virtually untouched, the rest of the space has been remodeled for its use as a public institution.

Gardens
The museum is situated on 25 acres (93,000 m²) of formal and informal gardens. Originally designed by Hare & Hare, the expansive grounds contain elaborate gardens inspired by Villa Lante, an Italian country estate north of Rome designed by Giacomo Barozzi da Vignola in 1566. The formal gardens, with its rills and diagonal walks linking the mansion to the rustic pool below, graced with a classical tempietto, are part of the original design and construction. To the south of the property the gardens extending to the summerhouse were conceived later and completed in 2004. They feature native Oklahoma plants and a refurbished creek. The bronze sculpture by Barry Flanagan, Thinker on a Rock, is located in this section.

Management
, the museum has a staff of 60 and an operating budget of nearly $6 million. During the tenure of director Randall Suffolk between 2007 and 2015, the museum reorganized its curatorial and educational departments to emphasize more family-friendly programming, leading to a 63 percent increase in attendance. Suffolk also sharply increased the museum’s operating budget and added 2,800 new works to its permanent collection. Suffolk left in 2015 to lead the High Museum of Art in Atlanta. In 2016, Scott Stulen left his role as a curator at the Indianapolis Museum of Art to become the new Philbrook Executive Director.

Collection

References

External links 
Philbrook Museum of Art
Bronze railings designed by Oscar Bach for Villa Philbrook
Voices of Oklahoma interview with Elliot "Chope" and Virginia Phillips. First person interview conducted on May 5, 2009 with Elliot "Chope" and Virginia Phillips, son and daughter-in-law of Waite Phillips. Original audio and transcript archived with Voices of Oklahoma oral history project.
Philbrook Museum of Art info and photos on TravelOK.com Official travel and tourism website for the State of Oklahoma
"Philbrook Museum of Art", Encyclopedia of Oklahoma History and Culture
Urban Tulsa Weekly
In Conversation with Scott Stulen
Virtual tour of the Philbrook Museum of Art provided by Google Arts & Culture

1939 establishments in Oklahoma
Art museums established in 1939
Art museums and galleries in Oklahoma
Asian art museums in the United States
Former private collections in the United States
Historic house museums in Oklahoma
Institutions accredited by the American Alliance of Museums
Museums in Tulsa, Oklahoma
Villas in the United States